Andrzej Wojciechowski (1 April 1933 – 16 June 1997) was a Polish boxer. He competed in the men's light heavyweight event at the 1956 Summer Olympics.

References

1933 births
1997 deaths
Polish male boxers
Olympic boxers of Poland
Boxers at the 1956 Summer Olympics
People from Włocławek
Light-heavyweight boxers
20th-century Polish people